Richard Francis Daly (1910–1984) was an Australian rugby league footballer who played in the 1930s.

Dick Daly was a Kogarah local junior who played two first grade seasons with St. George between 1933–1934. He played half-back in the 1933 Grand Final. His surname has been misspelt in many publications over the years as Daley.

Daly died on 10 July 1984 at Ramsgate, New South Wales, aged 74.

References

St. George Dragons players
Australian rugby league players
1910 births
1984 deaths
Rugby league halfbacks
Rugby league five-eighths
Rugby league players from Sydney